Franca Dominici (June 25, 1907 – October 14, 1999) was an Italian actress and voice actress.

Biography
Born in Bologna, the daughter of the actor Enrico, after studying at the Istituto Tecnico Dominici began her career on stage in her early twenties, in 1926, entering the theatrical company of Alfredo De Sanctis.

In the early 1930s, she had her first roles as lead actress, then she founded with Mario Siletti the stable company at the Teatro delle Muse in Rome.  In the late 1930s Dominici started an intense career as a character actress in films and later in television; in 1967 she had the main role in the television film La madre di nostra figlia.

Dominici also had a long radio activity and an intense career as a voice actress and a dubber, being the Italian voice of important actresses such as Thelma Ritter, Constance Bennett, Patricia Neal, Edwige Feuillère, Carmen Miranda and Joan Blondell. In her animated roles, she voiced Mother Rabbit in the Italian version of Robin Hood and Lady Tremaine in the 1967 redub of Cinderella.

Selected filmography
 The Ten Commandments (1945)
 Verdi, the King of Melody (1953)
 Schiava del peccato (1954)
 Wives and Obscurities (1956)
 The Intruder (1956)
 The Rival (1956)
 La trovatella di Pompei (1957)
 Il carro armato dell'8 settembre (1960)
 Kill, Baby, Kill (1966)
 Boccaccio (1972)
 Travolto dagli affetti familiari (1978)
 Troppo forte (1985)

References

External links 
 

1907 births
1999 deaths
Actors from Bologna
Italian film actresses
Italian television actresses
Italian stage actresses
Italian voice actresses
Italian radio actresses
20th-century Italian actresses